eMacambini is a rural area in the KwaZulu-Natal province of South Africa which is mostly populated by members of the Macambini clan.  It is near Mandeni on the Zululand coast, just north of Durban and close to the new King Shaka International Airport.

Threatened eviction
In November 2008, the community of eMacambini held a 5,000 strong march of about 10 km to protest the proposed AmaZulu World development to be built by Ruwaad Holdings from Dubai.  Earlier in the year, Ruwaad signed a memorandum of understanding with KZN Premier S’bu Ndebele. The planned R44m development by Ruwaad will occupy 16,500ha. In addition to the AmaZulu World Theme Park, plans include the largest shopping centre in Africa, a game reserve, six golf courses, residential facilities, sports fields and a statue of Shaka at the Thukela river mouth. To achieve this, the proposed development necessitates that the eMacambini community is going to be displaced from their rural land and rehoused on less land in a suburban township.  If the plan goes ahead, 29 schools, 300 churches, three clinics and brand-new RDP houses will be demolished. Especially relevant to the community would be the demolishing of ancestral graves. In all, between 20,000 and 50,000 people in the region will be forcibly removed.

Protest

On 4 December 2008, the eMacambini community blockaded the N2 and R102 freeways to protest S'bu Ndebele's non-reply to their memorandum handed over in a previous march.  Police responded with rubber bullets injuring about 50 people and arresting 10.  There were reports that many shot were innocent bystanders pulled out of their homes.  There are also reports that many of the 10 people arrested were refused medical treatment.  Police have justified their actions by claiming that residents threw stones at oncoming cars.

Support

The community is working closely with The Poor People's Alliance and has also lodged a complaint with the South African Human Rights Commission and as of December 2008 has planned to challenge the legality of the proposed development.

On 16 January 2008 the Centre on Housing Rights and Evictions in Geneva issued an open letter to S'bu Ndebele strongly condemning the proposed evictions and the violent police response to protests against it.

References

See also
Stockpile of information on eMacambini/AmaZulu World evictions
eMacambini from Google Earth
Film on eMacambini

Populated places in the Mandeni Local Municipality
Housing in South Africa
Land rights movements
Housing protests